The Civilista Party (PC) was a political party in Peru.

History
Founded as a countermeasure against the growing power of the military in Peru during the first half of the Republic, the party's sole purpose was to establish a civilian rule in the country. This, however, did not prevent them from creating political alliances with the military during its first years of existence. Founded in 1872, the party's first candidate was its founder, Manuel Pardo, who was elected on August 2, 1872.

During the 1870s, economic growth and a certain degree of political stability had laid the conditions for creating the country's first political party. It was also a new era of international trade, business, and finance that Peru was benefiting from. Some believed that this era required the managerial skills that an educated and professional Elite could provide and believed Manuel Pardo was apt for this job.

The Civilista Party was first primarily composed of the newly rich merchants, planters, and businesspeople in Peru (especially those who benefited themselves with the Guano Boom exportations). The members of the party believed that the military was corrupt and no longer capable of ruling the country and that it was more apt to serve it militarily than to rule it politically.

After the War of the Pacific and a successful revolution (that removed the military from power once again), the Party played a key role in the reconstruction of the country. Reviving its antimilitary and pro-export program, they secured the support of its constituents. Most of its members were part of the economic and social elite established in Lima.

Between 1899 and 1920, most Peruvian presidents had been members of this Party. This period of Peruvian history is often called the Aristocratic Republic (coined by Peruvians referring to the social elite that governed them). Elections, however, were restricted, subject to strict property and literacy qualifications, and more often than not manipulated by the incumbent Civilista regime.

The party, as a major political force, was disbanded during the so-called oncenio (11 years of power) of Augusto B. Leguía y Salcedo's second term.

References

External links
A brief description of the Aristocratic Republic

Political parties established in 1872
Liberal parties in Peru
1872 establishments in Peru
Defunct political parties in Peru